The 1997 Stanford Cardinal football team represented Stanford University in the 1997 NCAA Division I-A football season. They were led by head coach Tyrone Willingham. The Cardinal participated as members of the Pacific-10 Conference and played their home games at Stanford Stadium in Stanford, California.

Schedule

Roster
LB Chris Draft
QB Chad Hutchinson
K Kevin Miller
WR Troy Walters

Coaching Staff

Tyrone Willingham – Head coach
Dana Bible – Offensive coordinator and quarterbacks
Earle Mosley – Running backs
Mose Rison – wide receivers
Dave Borbely – Offensive line (centers and guards)
Chuck Moller – Tight ends and offensive line (tackles)
Bill Harris – Defensive coordinator and defensive backs
Phil Zacharias – Defensive ends and special teams coordinator
Kent Baer – Inside and outside linebacker
Dave Tipton – Recruiting coordinator

Season summary

California

100th meeting
Chris Draft intercepted a Justin Vedder pass at the Stanford 14 with 1:22 left to seal the win.

References

Stanford
Stanford Cardinal football seasons
Stanford Cardinal football